XK, Kell blood group complex subunit-related family, member 5 is a protein that in humans is encoded by the XKR5 gene.

References

Further reading 

Human proteins